The Eglinton River is located in the region of Southland in the southwest of New Zealand.

For much of its length the Eglinton is accompanied by the only road in the region, State Highway 94 from Te Anau to Milford Sound. The southern end of the Milford Track is located close to the Eglinton River.

The first Europeans to explore the river were David McKellar and George Gunn, in 1861. The river was named after Archibald Montgomerie, 13th Earl of Eglinton by James McKerrow, an Otago surveyor. The road which is now Highway 94 was built in 1935, opening up the valley to visitors.

The river flow is small leaving Lake Gunn but is greatly increased by Cascade Creek, which joins it just south of the lake. There are short gorges between Lake Gunn and Cascade Creek, and below the junction with Walker Creek. While the river has been kayaked from Cascade Creek, there is not usually sufficient water at this point and whitewater kayaking is more common from the junction with the East Branch. Rainbow and brown trout are available in the river up to Cascade Creek. Deer are hunted throughout the area, and wild pigs can be found near the river mouth.

References

Rivers of Fiordland
Rivers of Southland, New Zealand
Rivers of New Zealand